"Ek Chumma" is a song sung by Sohail Sen, Altamash Faridi and Jyotica Tangri from the film Housefull 4. The music of the song was composed by Sohail Sen while the lyrics were penned by Sameer Anjaan. The music video of the track features Akshay Kumar, Riteish Deshmukh, Bobby Deol, Kriti Sanon, Pooja Hegde and Kriti Kharbanda. The song's lyrical version was released on 11 October 2019, while the video song was released on 30 September 2019 under the music label T-Series.

Development
The song was recorded, mixed and mastered by Eric Pillai - Future Sound Of Bombay in Mumbai. The single is filmed in London.

Music video 
The music video features Akshay Kumar, Riteish Deshmukh, Bobby Deol, Kriti Sanon, Pooja Hegde and Kriti Kharbanda dancing for the single. The music is choreographed by Farah Khan. The song also features Queen Elizabeth II. The video song was officially released on 30 September 2019 under T-Series label, and garned lot of views due to its choreography and picturisation.

Release 
The teaser of the song was released on 28 September 2019. The video was released on 30 September 2020. The lyrical was released on 11 October 2019. The song was made available at iTunes the same day of release and for online streaming at JioSaavn and Gaana on 30 September 2019.

Reception

Audience response 
Upon the release of the full video version of the song, it gained lots of appreciation for its music and choreography.

Critical reviews 
Bollywood Hungama on reviewing the music of the soundtrack wrote that "There is a signature Housefull feel to the manner in which 'Ek Chumma' kick-starts the proceedings for Housefull 4. When it comes to the franchise, the music is expected to be peppy, lively and catering to the masses. This is what is the case with this Sameer Anjaan written number as well which has composer Sohail Sen also come behind the mike along with Altamash Faridi and Jyotica Tangri."

The Times of India stated that "Ek Chumma', has the clichéd ‘been there, heard that’ soundscape with a generous use of mandolin, clarinet, violin and percussions. Sung by Sohail Sen, Altamash Faridi and Jyotica Tangri, this track has been penned by Sameer Anjaan and the creators have succeeded in making it sound rather pedestrian."

Music credits
Credits adapted from T-Series.

 Sohail Sen – composer, programmer, arranger, vocals
 Altamash Faridi – vocals
 Jyotica Tangri – vocals
 Sameer Anjaan – lyrics
 Suresh Lalwani – arranger, violin
 Sameer Sen – rhythm, darabuka
 Jagdish Lalwani – programmer
 Chandrakant L – mandolin
 Sanjeev Sen – darabuka
 Raju Sardar – darabuka
 Rajkumar Sodha – clarinet
 Suresh Soni – percussions
 Pratap Rath – percussions
 John Hunt – percussions
 Shantanu Hudlikar – recording engineer
 Abhishek Khandelwal – recording engineer, assistance mixing, assistance mastering
 Manasi Tare – recording engineer
 Eric Pillai – mixing, mastering [at Future Sound of Bombay]
 Michael Edwin Pillai – assistance mixing
 Farah Khan – choreography

References

External links

2019 songs
Hindi film songs
Cultural depictions of Elizabeth II
T-Series (company) singles
Pop-folk songs